La Bohemе Magazine is a Russian literary and art magazine founded in 1915.

History 
The journal was published in 1915 in the publishing houses of M. Silin (No. 1-3), S. Cheremkhin (No. 4) and A. Lapitsky (No. 5-6). The editorial office was located in the apartment of Mikhail Reisner in Petrograd (Zagorodny Prospekt, 40, apt. 11).

The magazine was closed "for freethinking" after the sixth issue. In November 1915, it was revived by the Reisners under the name "Rudin". Produced until 1916, 8 issues were published.

Poets and writers L. Reissner, V. Zlobin, A. Lozina-Lozinsky, P. Ezersky, A. Balagin, V. Kholodkovsky published their works in the journal; artists A. Gegello, P. Shillingovsky, S. Skernovitsky, L. Slendzinsky, L. Rudnev, N. Lermontova  and others.

In 1993, the publication was registered with Roskomnadzor.
In 2017 it was registered by Moscluster.com with Roskomnadzor as an electronic media on the Internet.

The magazine is the official information partner of the Russian Gentry assembly, Mercedes-Benz Fashion Week Russia, Estet Fashion Week, FashionTV Russia "Fashion Summer Awards".

In 2022, the Russian video hosting Rutube Verified channel with the video version of La Bogeme Magazine. The video version of the magazine included such well-known fashion figures as Slava Zaitsev, Tatyana Mikhalkova, Sergey Zverev, Konstantin Gaidai, and also artists and actors Sergey Filin, Irina Bezrukova, Alice Mon, etc.

La Boheme magazine has its own events in the field of fashion and culture.

Editor-in-Chief 
 A.A. Zueva
 G. Rozov 
 Vladislav Ananishnev –  publisher - winner of the Fashion TV award, member of the International Federation of Journalists.

Honours 
 Professional honors and awards

References

External links
 
 La Bogemе Magazine on the Harvard Library

Publications established in 1915
Russian-language magazines
Literary magazines published in Russia